Edwin Epps House is a Creole cottage built in  in part by Solomon Northup on Bayou Boeuf near Holmesville in Avoyelles Parish, Louisiana. It was built for Edwin Epps, a slaveholder. The house was a "double-sided, wood frame house with one chimney, and a tin roof" of mid-sized farmers. The Edwin Epps Plantation Site, where the house originally stood, is located off of LA 1176 on Carl Hunt Road. It is one of the historic sites of Solomon Northup's enslavement on the Northup Trail.

Solomon Northup
The house figures in the life of Solomon Northup who built the house and where Epps is reported to have learned that Northup, who he had owned for ten years, was a free man. A team, including Sue Eakin, a history professor at Louisiana State University-Alexandria, researched Northup's book Twelve Years A Slave for accuracy and published a new version of the book in the 1960s. As part of the research, she found the house that Northup built, the Edwin Epps House. Over 150 years, the storms and time had decayed the original house.

Relocation

The house was relocated twice. In 1976, it was moved to nearby Bunkie. It was on the National Register of Historic Places from April 12, 1984, because it was important to the "history in the areas of literature and social/humanitarian because of its close association with the famous slave narrative Twelve Years a Slave.

In 1999, the house was dismantled, during which some original building materials were replaced, and reconstructed on the Louisiana State University of Alexandria. It was purchased for their Center for Studies of Life on Plantations. 

The relocation, among modern buildings, "destroys the integrity of location and setting, and can create a false sense of historic development." It was delisted from the National Register of Historic Places in 2017. 

The house was moved to the university to be used as a museum to help tell the story of plantation life, including the inhumanity and lack of freedom of the enslaved people. There is a room in the house that is dedicated to telling Northup's story. Other rooms tell of life on a plantation.

A historical marker erected near the site reads:

References

Plantation houses in Louisiana
Louisiana State University buildings and structures
Houses completed in 1852
Former National Register of Historic Places in Louisiana
1852 establishments in Louisiana